A.R.G.U.S. is a government organization in DC Comics. A.R.G.U.S. first appeared in Justice League vol. 2 #7 and was created by Geoff Johns and Gene Ha.

Headed by Amanda Waller, A.R.G.U.S. is typically depicted as a parent organization for the previously established Checkmate and Suicide Squad organizations. Since its debut, A.R.G.U.S has been adapted into numerous television projects within the Arrowverse, the DC Extended Universe (both film and television), as well as numerous animated projects.

Publication History 
Originally standing for Armed Revolutionaries Governing Under Secrecy, it became the Anonymous Ranger Group of the United States, then Advanced Research Group Uniting Super-Humans. Within the various television series set in the Arrowverse, as well as multiple animated, video game, and live-action projects, the acronym stands for Advanced Research Group United Support.

Fictional organizational history
A.R.G.U.S. is a United States federal agency operating under the jurisdiction of Homeland Security. It is under the command of Col. Steve Trevor and Director Amanda Waller. 
It is introduced in The New 52 (a reboot of DC Comics continuity) following Darkseid's invasion. A.R.G.U.S. acts as support and liaison to the Justice League, supplying them with resources and cleaning up afterwards. Trevor was asked to stand down as head liaison after their battle with Graves, having gotten too close to Wonder Woman.

During the "Trinity War" storyline, A.R.G.U.S. later directly establishes the counterpart group to the Justice League in the form of the Justice League of America, of which Trevor is himself a member. Dr. Arthur Light is called in by A.R.G.U.S. to examine the Secret Society's communication coin. While doing so, it is manipulated from the other side causing Light to be enveloped in a white light, giving him powers. After seemingly losing control of his powers, Superman surrenders himself to A.R.G.U.S. at A.R.G.U.S. headquarters, the Question enters Superman's cell and releases him.

During the "Forever Evil" storyline, Steve Trevor awakes at the remains of the A.R.G.U.S. headquarters in Washington, D.C and learns from Etta Candy that the headquarters' destruction was caused by a massive spike in energy around Doctor Light's body and that A.R.G.U.S. and its agents have been completely exposed. After seeing the Crime Syndicate of America's broadcast, Trevor learns that the President of the United States is in danger as the President has a backup key that would assist in A.R.G.U.S. gaining their assets back. After rescuing the President from Deathstroke, Copperhead, and Shadow Thief, Trevor uses the President's key to open A.R.G.U.S.' Green Room to keep the President and Candy safe. Then he heads to the Wonder Room which he has filled with mementos of his past relationship with Wonder Woman to use the Delphi Mirror to strike a deal with the Moirai. While in the Green Room, Candy begins investigating about the founding of A.R.G.U.S. Martin Stein takes Trevor and Killer Frost to his secret off the grid basement where he uses his teleportation devices to transport them to A.R.G.U.S.' Detroit station known as "The Circus". Inside, they encounter fellow A.R.G.U.S. agents, who allow Trevor to talk to one of their prisoners named Psi in hopes of seeing if she could psychologically disrupt the Firestorm matrix to free the Justice League. In the Green Room, the President and "Mr. Green" discuss a promotion with Candy. "Mr. Green" later reveals the history of A.R.G.U.S. "Mr. Green" reveals himself to be a member of the Crimson Men who are looking to reshape A.R.G.U.S. through Trevor and Candy.

Members
 Sasha Bordeaux - Director
 Amanda Waller - Former director, head of the Suicide Squad
 Steve Trevor - Original founder, head of the Oddfellows
 Black Orchid
 Booster Gold
 Casey Klebba - Agent and husband of Dale Gunn.
 Chronos
 Dale Gunn - Agent and Director of Circus of A.R.G.U.S.
 Darwin - The assistant to Dr. John Peril.
 Dr. John Peril - Top scientist.
 Etta Candy - Steve Trevor's secretary.
 Major Nicholson - She runs an A.R.G.U.S. base in Wisconsin called the Clinic.
 Meadows Mahalo - Special agent.
 John Economos - Warden of Belle Reve and ally of The Suicide Squad.
 Suicide Squad
 Task Force X
 Katana - Field Leader; former Second-in-command
 Deadshot
 Captain Boomerang / George "Digger" Harkness
 Harley Quinn
 Killer Croc
 Task Force XL
 Deadshot - Field Leader
 Akando
 Captain Boomerang/Digger Harkness
 Giganta
 Harley Quinn
 Katana
 Parasite / Joshua Michael Allen
 Solomon Grundy
 Suicide Squad Black
 El Diablo/Chato Santana - Field Leader
 Azucar / Veronica Lopez
 Enchantress / June Moone
 Gentlemen Ghost
 Juniper / Zahra Abed
 Klarion the Witch Boy
 Tiamat / Katie Randles
 Wither / Jade Tice
 Oddfellows - A clandestine A.R.G.U.S. unit that investigates superhuman and supernatural occurrences.
 Charlie - 
 Chief - 
 Sameer - 
 Paul Chang
 Puzzler
 Stuart Paillard - Special agent.
 Victoria October - Doctor and post-human bio-weapons expert.

Former members
 Atom / Rhoda Pineda - She was revealed to be a mole for the Crime Syndicate of America.
 Doctor Light / Arthur Light - Scientist.
 Doctor Mist - Residential sorcerer for A.R.G.U.S.' magic division.
 Doctor Polaris
 Fastrack - 
 Primeape - Sam Simeon was a scientist and colleague of Dr. O'Day who was turned into a humanoid gorilla following an accident during his experiments with gorilla DNA from Gorilla City. Cheetah once controlled him where he operated as Priemape of the Menagerie.
 Sebastian Faust - Director of A.R.G.U.S's magic division.
 Spore - Scientist.

In other media

Television
 A.R.G.U.S. was mentioned in the Beware the Batman episode "Hunted".
 A.R.G.U.S. appears in series taking place in the Arrowverse franchise. In this continuity, A.R.G.U.S. stands for Advanced Research Group United Support, and its core members are Amanda Waller and Lyla Michaels:
 A.R.G.U.S. is first seen in Arrow, where the agency has a major presence in every season. In season seven, John Diggle has joined up with A.R.G.U.S. at the time when Oliver Queen was incarcerated in Slabside Maximum Security Prison.
 A.R.G.U.S. appears in The Flash.
 A.R.G.U.S. appears in Legends of Tomorrow. The episode "Zari" features an A.R.G.U.S.-controlled dystopian future where religion and metahuman activity are banned. Zari Tomaz, a Muslim woman in possession of a totem that gives her air-based powers, is pursued by the futuristic A.R.G.U.S. before joining the Legends. This future is averted when Neron is defeated.
 A.R.G.U.S. appears in Superman & Lois. On this show's Earth, A.R.G.U.S. collaborated with Sam Lane when it comes to dealing with Tal-Rho. It is also shown that there is a version of John Diggle on this Earth while Lyla was mentioned to existing here.
 In the Doom Patrol episode "Donkey Patrol", Cyborg hacks into A.R.G.U.S. to learn more about the incident in Cloverton, Ohio where it was swallowed into the White Space.
 A.R.G.U.S. appears in the Titans episode "Purple Rain". It is revealed A.R.G.U.S. has been in Gotham since the reappearance of Ra's al Ghul. A.R.G.U.S. also is being run by Roy Harper and an agent using the name of "Margarita Vee" (portrayed by Karen Robinson) has been undercover at GCPD working with Barbara Gordon for some time. A.R.G.U.S. assists the Titans in their final fight against Jonathan Crane and the GCPD officers that are on his side.
 A.R.G.U.S. appears in the HBO Max series Peacemaker, set in the DC Extended Universe. Though Amanda Waller is mentioned several times and appears briefly in two episodes, the primary focus is on the team of agents John Economos, Emilia Harcourt, Waller's recently recruited daughter Leota Adebayo, Peacemaker and Vigilante as they track down alien "butterflies" on the orders of Clemson Murn, an intermediary agent for Waller. "Clemson Murn" is later revealed to be the identity of the man inhabited by the rogue butterfly Ik Nobe Lok, allied with humans to exterminate the rest of his hostile species. After the butterflies are defeated, Leota exposes Project Butterfly much to the dismay of Waller.

Film
 A.R.G.U.S. appears in Batman: Assault on Arkham. They attempted to apprehend Riddler after the latter stole vital information relating to the Suicide Squad from Amanda Waller, as well as entering a confrontation with Batman, who intended to interrogate the Riddler himself relating to a dirty bomb that Joker stole and placed somewhere in Gotham.
 A.R.G.U.S. appears in the DC Extended Universe. This version is a covert sub-branch of the US military that becomes the supervisor of the Suicide Squad. The motto for the organization is "Noster quaerere incipere", Latin for "Our search begins". Its headquartered in the John F. Ostrander Federal Building (a reference to comics writer John Ostrander, who instigated the modern incarnation of the Suicide Squad) in Midway City. Just like the comics, Amanda Waller (portrayed by Viola Davis) is the director of A.R.G.U.S. and plays a central role in forming its associated teams of supervillains. 
 A.R.G.U.S. was first mentioned by Lex Luthor in 2016's Batman v Superman: Dawn of Justice.
 A.R.G.U.S. and Amanda Waller are central to the formation of Task Force X in the 2016 film Suicide Squad. During their mission to stop Enchantress, Joker, his enforcer Jonny Frost, and his minions attack the Van Criss Laboratories branch of Wayne Enterprises to get A.R.G.U.S. ally Van Criss to help him free Harley Quinn from the A.R.G.U.S. nano-bombs in her head. Bruce Wayne receives A.R.G.U.S. intelligence from Waller at the end of the film and threatens that the Justice League will get involved if she doesn't shut down her team. 
 A.R.G.U.S. appears again as the central organization in The Suicide Squad. Waller commands desk agents Flo Crawley, John Economos, and Emilia Harcourt in directing the ground teams in Corto Maltese. Crawley knocks out Waller before she can kill the Suicide Squad for disobeying her orders to leave Starro unabated, allowing everyone to help save Corto Maltese. A furious Waller wakes up and has Crawley publicly arrested before sending Economos and Harcourt to monitor Peacemaker's recovery teasing the events of Peacemaker. 
 A.R.G.U.S. is featured in Batman and Harley Quinn. Sarge Steel is shown to be an A.R.G.U.S. agent working with Batman to stop Poison Ivy and Floronic Man.
 A.R.G.U.S. appears in Suicide Squad: Hell to Pay.

Video Games
 A.R.G.U.S. appears in DC Universe Online.

References

External links
 A.R.G.U.S. at DC Comics Wiki
 A.R.G.U.S. at Comic Vine
 A.R.G.U.S. at Comic Book Realm

DC Comics teams
Fictional intelligence agencies
Fictional organizations in comics
Characters created by Geoff Johns
DC Comics organizations